Season of Glass may refer to:

Literature 

 "Seasons of Glass and Iron", 2016 fantasy story by Amal El-Mohtar

Music 
 Season of Glass (album), 1981 album by Yoko Ono
 Season of Glass (EP), 2015 EP by GFriend